"Bring Me Some Water" is the debut single of American singer Melissa Etheridge. It was released in 1988 and became a hit in several countries, reaching the top 20 in Australia, New Zealand, and on the US Billboard Album Rock Tracks chart.

Song information
Melissa Etheridge wrote the song after the initial version of her debut album was rejected by the recording company, which left her only four days to provide new material and a modified edition of the album. At the time, she was residing in Los Angeles while her girlfriend, Kathleen, lived elsewhere, so Etheridge had reluctantly agreed to make theirs a non-monogamous relationship. The song tells about the pain and jealousy arising from thoughts of her lover being intimate with someone else. There are many metaphors in the lyrics describing her emotional state, principally the chorus line: "Somebody bring me some water – can't you see I'm burning alive." Many other songs on the album deal with the same subject.

Musically, "Bring Me Some Water" is a classic rock song with some blues themes. During an interview featured on the bonus DVD of Greatest Hits: The Road Less Traveled, Etheridge says:

Furthermore, she states that, of all the songs she has written, "Bring Me Some Water" is the one with the highest recognition value and that wherever she plays the song in the world, everybody at her concerts knows the song after the first seconds of the intro.

Etheridge has collaborated with contemporary pop musicians on two notable recorded-live television performances of this song: Joan Osborne, who appeared as one of several guest artists on the inaugural November 22, 1995, episode of the VH1 Duets series; and Kelly Clarkson on the September 17, 2009 VH1 Divas concert special.

"Bring Me Some Water" was remade by American blues artist Koko Taylor and recorded on her 2000 album, Royal Blue.

Track listings
All songs were written by Melissa Etheridge.

7-inch and Australian cassette single
A. "Bring Me Some Water" – 3:52
B. "Occasionally" – 2:36

UK 12-inch and CD single
 "Bring Me Some Water" – 3:52
 "Occasionally" – 2:36
 "I Want You" – 4:07

Australian 12-inch single
A1. "Bring Me Some Water"
B1. "Occasionally"
B2. "Similar Features" (live)

Credits and personnel
 Melissa Etheridge – acoustic guitar, guitar, vocals
 Wally Badarou – keyboard
 Craig Krampf – percussion, drums
 Kevin McCormick – bass
 Johnny Lee Schell – guitar
 Scott Thurston – keyboard
 Waddy Wachtel – guitar
 Producers: Melissa Etheridge, Niko Bolas, Craig Krampf, Kevin McCormick
 Executive producers: Chris Blackwell, Rob Fraboni
 Engineers: Allan Blazek, Jim Nipar
 Assistant engineer: David Kane
 Mixing assistants: Duane Seykora, Bob Vogt
 Mastering: Stephen Marcussen
 Arrangers: Melissa Etheridge, Craig Krampf
 Photography: George DuBose
 Cover design: Tony Wright

Charts

Weekly charts

Year-end charts

References

 Melissa Etheridge and Laura Morton: The truth is..., Random House 2002
 Greatest Hits: The Road Less Traveled bonus DVD
 "Bring Me Some Water" at musicmoz.com

1988 songs
1988 debut singles
Island Records singles
Melissa Etheridge songs
Song recordings produced by Niko Bolas
Songs written by Melissa Etheridge